George Bassett Clark (February 14, 1827 – December 20, 1891)  was an American instrument maker and astronomer.

Born in Lowell, Massachusetts and educated at Phillips Academy, Andover, he was the son of Alvan Clark, part of a family of refracting telescope makers in the 19th century. In 1846, George Bassett Clark joined his father and brother at the family's telescope works in Cambridge, Massachusetts. The firm, Alvan Clark & Sons, made many of the record-breaking refracting instruments, including the still-largest refracting telescope at the Yerkes Observatory, gaining "worldwide fame and distribution", wrote one author on astronomy in 1899. Clark was elected a Fellow of the American Academy of Arts and Sciences in 1878.

See also
 List of astronomical instrument makers

References

External links
 Portraits of George Bassett Clark from the Lick Observatory Records Digital Archive, UC Santa Cruz Library's Digital Collections

1827 births
1891 deaths
Phillips Academy alumni
American astronomers
Fellows of the American Academy of Arts and Sciences
People from Lowell, Massachusetts